Ory Okolloh (or Ory Okolloh Mwangi) is a Kenyan activist, lawyer, and blogger. She is Director of Investments at Omidyar Network.  She was formerly the Policy Manager for Africa with Google. In 2007, Okolloh co-created Ushahidi.

Early life 
She earned an undergraduate degree in Political Science from the University of Pittsburgh and graduated from Harvard Law School in 2005.

Career 
In 2006 she co-founded the parliamentary watchdog site Mzalendo (Swahili: "Patriot"). The site sought to increase government accountability by systematically recording bills, speeches, MPs, standing orders, etc.

When Kenya was engulfed in violence following a disputed presidential election in 2007, Okolloh co-created Ushahidi (Swahili: "Witness"), a website and tool that collected and recorded eyewitness reports of violence using text messages and Google Maps.  The technology has since been adapted for expanded purposes (including monitoring elections and tracking pharmaceutical availability) and used in a number of other countries.

Okolloh has a personal blog, Kenyan Pundit, which was featured on Global Voices Online.

She has worked as a legal consultant for NGOs and has worked at Covington and Burling, the Kenya National Commission on Human Rights, and the World Bank.

Okolloh was appointed on the Board of Thomson Reuters Founders Share Company, the body that acts as a guardian of the Thomson Reuters Trust Principles in May 2015.

Notes

External links
 Kenyan Pundit
 Ushahidi
 Mzalendo

Kenyan activists
Kenyan women activists
21st-century Kenyan lawyers
University of Pittsburgh alumni
Harvard Law School alumni
Living people
Kenyan bloggers
Kenyan women bloggers
Year of birth missing (living people)
Kenyan women lawyers